Domecy-sur-Cure (literally Domecy on Cure) is a commune in the Yonne department in Bourgogne-Franche-Comté in north-central France.

The commune is known for the Château de Domecy-sur-Cure, which dates back to the 15th century.

See also
Communes of the Yonne department
Parc naturel régional du Morvan

References

Communes of Yonne